Sir George Manners (1569–1623) of Haddon Hall in Derbyshire, England, served as a Member of Parliament for Nottingham, 1588–1589, and for Derbyshire, 1593–1596. His elaborate triple-decked monument with kneeling effigies of himself and his wife and family survives in the Vernon/Haddon Chapel, All Saints Church, Bakewell, Derbyshire.

Origins
He was the eldest son and heir of Sir John Manners (bef.1535–1611) (the second son of Thomas Manners, 1st Earl of Rutland of Belvoir Castle) of Shelford in Nottinghamshire and of Haddon Hall, Derbyshire, MP, and his wife Dorothy Vernon, a daughter and co-heiress of Sir George Vernon of Haddon Hall.

Marriage and children
He married Grace Pierrepont, a daughter of Sir Henry Pierrepont, MP, of Holme Pierrepont, Nottinghamshire, by whom he had four sons and five daughters including:

Sons
John Manners, 8th Earl of Rutland (1604–1679), eldest son and heir, who in 1641 inherited the earldom on the death of his second cousin George Manners, 7th Earl of Rutland. He married Frances Montagu, a daughter of Sir Edward Montagu, 1st Baron Montagu of Boughton.

Daughters
Elizabeth Manners, who married Robert Sutton, 1st Baron Lexinton.
Eleanor Manners, who married Lewis Watson, 1st Baron Rockingham, and had issue.
Frances Manners (died 1652), who married Nicholas Saunderson, 2nd Viscount Castleton, and had issue.
Dorothy Manners, who married Sir Thomas Lake.

References

Further reading
Manners, George (c. 1569–1623), of Haddon Hall, Derbys. and Uffington, Lincs. Published in The History of Parliament: the House of Commons 1558–1603, ed. P. W. Hasler, 1981 

1569 births
1623 deaths
People from Derbyshire (before 1895)
Manners family
Members of the Parliament of England for Derbyshire